Tareg Ali Hamedi (born 26 July 1998) is a Saudi Arabian karateka. He represented Saudi Arabia at the 2020 Summer Olympics in Tokyo, Japan. He won the silver medal in the men's +75 kg event after being disqualified for knocking out his opponent with an illegal kick. He is a seven-time medalist, including three gold medals, at the Asian Karate Championships. He is also a gold medalist at the 2021 Islamic Solidarity Games and a bronze medalist at the 2018 Asian Games.

Career 

He became world champion in the junior kumite 76+ kg event at the 2015 World Junior, Cadet and U21 Championships held in Jakarta, Indonesia. In 2016, he won his first gold medal in the Karate1 Premier League. He secured the gold medal in the men's kumite +84 kg event at the Karate1 Premier League event held in Okinawa, Japan.

At the 2017 Asian Karate Championships held in Astana, Kazakhstan, he defeated Sajjad Ganjzadeh of Iran (world champion in this event at the time) to win the gold medal in the men's kumite +84 kg event. In 2018, he won one of the bronze medals in the men's kumite +84 kg event at the Asian Karate Championships held in Amman, Jordan. He also won the silver medal in the men's team kumite event. A few days later, he won one of the bronze medals in the men's team kumite event at the World University Karate Championships held in Kobe, Japan. A month later, he won one of the bronze medals in men's kumite +84 kg event at the 2018 Asian Games held in Jakarta, Indonesia.

At the 2019 Asian Karate Championships held in Tashkent, Uzbekistan, he won two medals: the gold medal in the men's kumite +84 kg event and the silver medal in the men's team kumite event.

In 2021, he qualified at the World Olympic Qualification Tournament held in Paris, France to compete at the 2020 Summer Olympics in Tokyo, Japan. He won the silver medal in the men's +75 kg event. This was Saudi Arabia's second silver medal and fourth medal overall across all Olympic games. A few months after the Olympics, he competed in the men's +84 kg event at the World Karate Championships held in Dubai, United Arab Emirates. At the 2021 Asian Karate Championships held in Almaty, Kazakhstan, he won two medals: the gold medal in the men's kumite +84 kg event and one of the bronze medals in the men's team kumite event.

He won the gold medal in the men's +84 kg event at the 2021 Islamic Solidarity Games held in Konya, Turkey. He defeated Asiman Gurbanli of Azerbaijan in his gold medal match.

Achievements

References

External links 

 
 

1998 births
Living people
Place of birth missing (living people)
Saudi Arabian male karateka
Karateka at the 2018 Asian Games
Asian Games medalists in karate
Asian Games bronze medalists for Saudi Arabia
Medalists at the 2018 Asian Games
Karateka at the 2020 Summer Olympics
Medalists at the 2020 Summer Olympics
Olympic medalists in karate
Olympic silver medalists for Saudi Arabia
Islamic Solidarity Games medalists in karate
Islamic Solidarity Games competitors for Saudi Arabia
21st-century Saudi Arabian people